"Shakin'" is a song by American rock singer Eddie Money from his Platinum-certified album No Control, released in 1982.  It was co-written by Money, Elizabeth Myers, and Ralph Carter, and released as a single, reaching #63 on the Billboard Hot 100 chart and #9 on the Mainstream Rock Tracks. The song remains one of Money's most popular amongst fans.

The video for the single featured actress/model Patricia Kotero, better known as Apollonia, as the female doing the "shakin". She would later go on to co-star in the film Purple Rain.

Lyrics
In 2018, Money confirmed a longstanding theory to Rolling Stone magazine that the song did indeed include the word "tits," ("Her tits were shakin' till the middle of the night") even in the version played on the radio.

In popular culture
The song is a playable track on the music video game Guitar Hero Encore: Rocks the 80s. The song's video was featured on an episode of Beavis and Butt-Head.  The duo enjoyed the video, particularly Money's faces while watching Apollonia dance around.

References

External links
 

Eddie Money songs
1982 singles
1981 songs
Songs written by Eddie Money
Columbia Records singles
Songs written by Liz Myers
Songs about dancing